Planert is a surname. Notable people with the surname include:

Kim Planert, German film and television composer
Mandy Planert (born 1975), German slalom canoeist
 (born 1964), German historian